Andrew Ian Ross (31 January 1956 – 25 January 2022) was a British music executive, influential in the history of Britpop in the mid-1990s.

Early life and education
Ross was born on 31 January 1956. He came from south London and attended Dulwich College. He studied economic and social history from 1975 to 1978 at the University of Leicester, gaining a BA degree. At university he formed the band Disco Zombies.

Career
Ross started working in record shops. He worked for the Inland Revenue for two years to get a mortgage. Through a friend he became a part-time music journalist. He left the Inland Revenue around 1986 to head Food Records in central Camden, whilst still a part-time journalist for Sounds magazine. Food Records had been formed in the mid-1980s by David Balfe.

Ross saw Blur at the Islington Powerhaus in November 1989; of live music in pubs he said that "it's essential for any artist to play in front of a live audience for interaction". Blur also played at the Bull and Gate in Kentish Town. He signed Blur on 7 March 1990; the band were given a small advance and a celebration was held at a pizza house on Beak Street.

Ross said that the Reading Festival in August 1993 (where they headlined the Melody Maker stage on Saturday) was the turning point of Blur's career. EMI bought out Food Records in early 1994. He often went to the Good Mixer pub in north London, an Irish bar on Inverness Street, which had been developed by Bal Croce of the Sting-rays; Morrissey was one of the regulars, with Pulp and Menswear.

With Damon Albarn, Ross decided to bring forward the release of Blur's 1995 single "Country House". The album 13 was the last Blur album associated with Food Records. He also signed the Supernaturals from Glasgow and worked with the Bluetones.

Personal life and death
Ross died from complications following treatment for cancer on 25 January 2022, at the age of 65.

See also
 John Robb
 Saul Galpern of Nude Records, who signed Suede
 Live Forever: The Rise and Fall of Brit Pop, 2003 film
 Mike Smith also signed Blur for publishing

References

External links
 NME
 BBC 6 Music April 2014
 One Better Day - 6 Music February 2020

1956 births
2022 deaths
People from London
Alumni of the University of Leicester
Blur (band)
Britpop
English music journalists
English music managers
People educated at Dulwich College